The East Coast Super League is a senior ice hockey league in New South Wales, Australia. The league played its first season in 2002 with four teams and has recently finished its fifteenth season with five teams. The most recent champion is the Reach Rebels who won the 2016 regular season and playoffs.

Seasons

See also

Australian Ice Hockey League

References

External links
ECSL Official Website

Ice hockey seasons
 
Seasons, ECSL